The 2020–2023 Western Saharan clashes, also called the Guerguerat crisis, Moroccan military intervention in Guerguerat or Second Western Sahara War (this latter used by Polisario supporters), is an armed conflict between the Kingdom of Morocco and the self-proclaimed Sahrawi Arab Democratic Republic (SADR), represented at the United Nations by the Polisario Front, in the disputed region of Western Sahara. It was the latest escalation of an unresolved conflict over the region, which is largely occupied by Morocco, but 20–25% is administered by the SADR. The violence ended a ceasefire between the opposing sides that had held for 29 years in anticipation of a referendum of self-determination that would have settled the dispute. Despite the establishment of the United Nations Mission for the Referendum in Western Sahara in 1991, the referendum was never held.

Tensions between Morocco and the Polisario Front deepened in mid-October 2020 when Sahrawi peaceful protesters blocked a controversial road connecting Moroccan-occupied Western Sahara to sub-Saharan Africa. The protesters camped on the road near the small village of Guerguerat, where it passes through a 5-kilometer-wide buffer strip monitored by the UN. Despite the controversy, the route had grown in economic importance, such that the protest stranded about 200 Moroccan truck drivers on the Mauritanian side of the border. According to the Sahrawi authorities, the Moroccan forces were deployed near the area in early November, with Mauritanian forces reinforcing their positions along its border with Morocco, which is controlled by the Polisario Front.

On 13 November, Morocco launched a military operation from the Berm into the demilitarized buffer strip of Western Sahara to clear the protesters near Guerguerat and restore the free movement of goods and people. The Polisario Front urged the United Nations to intervene, noting that the Moroccan military operation violated the ceasefire agreements of the 1990s, and furthermore accused the Moroccan security forces of shooting at unarmed civilians in the buffer strip. Morocco denied there had been any armed clashes between the sides and said the truce remained in place, while SADR authorities declared the ceasefire over. Clashes spread that same day along the Moroccan Berm, with Morocco claiming that it had repelled a Sahrawi incursion near Al Mahbes. The SADR declared war on Morocco the next day. Since the beginning of the conflict, both countries have begun mass mobilisation and the SADR Ministry of Defense claims to be carrying out daily bombardments on military objectives along the Moroccan Berm. It is the first major clash in the region since 1991.

Background

The disputed region of Western Sahara is a sparsely-populated area mostly comprising desert territories, situated in the Maghreb region of Africa's northwest coast. The region was a Spanish colony until February 1976, when the Spanish government informed the United Nations that it withdrew from the territory. Since then, the region has been the subject of a long-running territorial dispute between Morocco, supported by a number of its prominent Arab allies, including Saudi Arabia and Jordan, and the Saharawi Republic (SADR), an African Union member state established by the Algerian-backed pro-independence Polisario Front, which is recognized by the United Nations as the legitimate representative of the indigenous Sahrawi people. Some commentators have connected Morocco's interests over the region with the idea of Greater Morocco, which encompasses Western Sahara and parts of both Mauritania, Mali, and Algeria, and according to the narrative, was divided up by the French and Spanish colonizers. Morocco, claiming Tindouf and Béchar provinces, invaded Algeria in 1963, resulting in the brief Sand War, which ended in a military stalemate.

While the Polisario Front had waged a low-intensity war of national liberation against Spanish colonial authorities since May 1973, the Western Sahara War began in October 1975, just weeks before the death of long-time Spanish dictator Francisco Franco, when Moroccan and Mauritanian forces, aided by France, invaded the Spanish colony. While Mauritania withdrew from Western Sahara and recognized the Saharawi Republic early in the conflict, by the end of the war Morocco had obtained control of more than two-thirds of the vast desert territory in its western part, along the Atlantic Ocean. After the war, on 6 September 1991, an UN-brokered ceasefire was signed, promising a referendum on self-determination to the Sahrawis. The United Nations has recognising the area as a non-self-governing territory since 1963; it is also the only African territory on the list, making the Western Sahara the last African territory subject to decolonization. Despite the efforts, the planned referendum has been repeatedly delayed ever since then; Morocco had refused the terms of the referendum, citing its dissatisfaction with who was allowed to vote, while tens of thousands of Moroccans have emigrated to the region since the 1970s.

The Polisario Front considers the road illegal since they say it was built in violation of the ceasefire. Tensions yet again deepened between Morocco and the Polisario Front in mid-October, when unarmed Sahrawi refugees from Tindouf, Algeria (where Polisario-administered refugee camps house about 100,000 Sahrawi refugees) passed through SADR-controlled territories to camp on and block the road in protest of what they called the plunder of Western Saharan resources from the Sahrawi people, creating a large caravan of vehicles and blocking traffic in the region. Morocco, which regards the region as vital to trade with sub-Saharan Africa, accused the Polisario Front of infiltrating the buffer zone and "carrying out acts of banditry" in Guerguerat. The Moroccan authorities also stated that the Polisario Front was harassing UN troops at the crossing, though the UN denied this. In early November, around 200 Moroccan truck drivers appealed to Moroccan and Mauritanian authorities for help, saying they were stranded on the Mauritanian side of the border near Guerguerat, and adding that they didn't have access to drinking water, food, shelter, or medicine, with some suffering from chronic illnesses. According to Jeune Afrique, Morocco first appealed to the United Nations to resolve the conflict peacefully, and that although the Secretary-General of the United Nations, António Guterres, approved this request, the situation was not resolved. Guterres himself likewise said that he had launched numerous initiatives to evade an escalation in the buffer zone, but his efforts had failed. On 8 November, Polisario Front authorities stated that Morocco was deploying a large number of police and other security forces near Guerguerat. On 12 November, Mauritanian forces reinforced their positions along border Polisario Front-controlled territories bordering Mauritania.

Course of the conflict

2020 
13 November: The clashes erupted on 13 November, when the Moroccan forces launched an offensive on Guerguerat to seize control of the road passing by the village, which was blocked by around 50 Sahrawi activists. According to Sahrawi sources, the Moroccan forces violated the ceasefire by penetrating the demilitarized zone, crossing the Moroccan Western Sahara Wall in three different directions. The Moroccan authorities stated that they had acted in self-defence, after a Sahrawi attack on Al Mahbes, and launched an offensive to restore free circulation of civilian and commercial traffic in the area. Later in the day, the Polisario Front stated that its forces fired upon four Moroccan bases and two checkpoints along the security wall. Then, the Royal Moroccan Armed Forces claimed full control over the Guerguerat border crossing.
14 November: The Sahrawi Arab Democratic Republic officially declared war on Morocco. The Polisario Front then stated that its forces had launched attacks on Moroccan military positions near Bagari, Al Mahbes, and Guerguerat. Morocco denied that it suffered casualties.
15 November: More skirmishing was reported between SADR and Moroccan forces along the security wall, especially near Al Mahbes where Moroccan forces claimed to have destroyed an SPLA armoured vehicle.
 16 November: MINURSO reported continued skirmishing along the security wall.
18 November: MINURSO reported harassing fire at points along the security wall.
24 November: The spokesman for the United Nations Secretary-General, Stéphane Dujarric, stated during his daily press briefing that MINURSO remains present and continues to monitor the situation throughout the territory, including Guerguerat. The United Nations also continues to receive reports of fire scattered throughout the northern and eastern parts of the berm, with the spokesperson stating that these incidents often occur at night.
11 December: The spokesman for the UN Secretary-General, Stéphane Dujarric, stated that the United Nations was still in contact with MINURSO in Western Sahara and that the mission had not witnessed any activity on the ground that would raise any concern in the past 24 hours.

2021 
23 January: The Polisario Front's official news agency reported that they fired four missiles near a Moroccan-controlled border post at Guerguerat.
3 February: For the 43rd consecutive day, the SADR has claimed to attack Moroccan positions. The SADR Ministry of National Defense said they have carried out concentrated bombardments against Moroccan positions in Gararat Al-Firsik region, Mahbes sector. Along with bombardment in Um Dagan region, Al-Bagari sector; Ajbeilat Lajdar region, Guelta sector; and Lagseibiyin region, Farsía Sector.
9 February: The Polisario claimed that it had killed three Moroccan soldiers the previous day in a specific attack in the Ouarkziz region of southern Morocco, near the disputed territory of Western Sahara. Contacted by the French press, the information was not denied by the Moroccan government.
1 March: A spokesperson for António Guterres, the United Nations' Secretary-General, addressed the situation in Western Sahara during a daily press briefing. According to a near-verbatim transcript, he said that MINURSO "continues to receive unconfirmed reports of sporadic firing across the berm."
8 April: The Polisario head of the gendarmerie Addah al-Bendir was killed by what reports claim to be a drone strike, while attempting raid on Moroccan positions along berm. The Sahrawi Ministry of Defense reported the military commander's "martyrdom," confirming his death to AFP. However, moments after publishing the news in the Polisario Front's official news agency, the Sahrawi Ministry of Defense removed it from its official publication.
14 October: A patrol of the Sahrawi People's Liberation Army consisting of several armed vehicles opened fire at a guard post near the Moroccan wall on Thursday night. The Royal Moroccan Army fired back and repelled the attack.
17 October: Brahim Ghali announced that attacks on Morocco by the Sahrawi People's Liberation Army will continue.
18 October: The Polisario Front fired rockets along sites near Al Mahbes.
14/15 November: Two Moroccan drone strikes hit SUVs near the berm, killing 11 people. The Moroccan government claims they were members of the Polisario Front attempting to cross the Moroccan Western Sahara Wall, while pro-Polisario sources claimed they were civilians, although some pro-Polisario sources did acknowledge the "martyrdom" of one militant.
17 November: The Sahrawi People's Liberation Army (SPLA), through its official news agency, claimed to have concentrated their artillery fire against the Moroccan forces entrenched in the Acheidmiya and Rus Asabti regions, in the Mahbes sector.
18 November: The SPLA claimed through its official news agency to have carried out bombardments against Moroccan forces in north of the Galb Dirit region, in the Hauza sector and the Gabl Ad-dalim region, in the Tichla sector.
19 November: The SPLA claimed through its official news agency to have carried out new attacks against Moroccan forces at various points of the Moroccan berm, in the Laagad and Sabjat Tnushad regions, both in the Mahbes region. Brahim Ghali criticized the Resolution 2602 of the UN Security Council, and recalls that the Polisario Front cannot commit to any cooperation outside the framework agreed in the 1991 AU-UN Solution Plan.
20 November: The SPLA claimed through its official news agency to have carried out new attacks against the Moroccan forces positioned in the regions of Russ Sabti and the Udey Amarkba, in the Mahbes sector. Robert F. Kennedy Human Rights expressed its "deep concern" over reports of attacks and human rights violations against Sultana Sid Brahim Khaya by Morocco.
21 November: The SPLA claimed through its official news agency to have carried out new attacks against the Moroccan forces positioned in the region of Fadrat Almars in the Hauza sector. Polisario front demanded all foreign companies to immediately withdraw from Western Sahara, considering their presence in the region as a flagrant violation of international law.
22 November: The SPLA claimed through its official news agency to have carried out new attacks against Moroccan forces positioned in the regions of Fadrat Tamat, Um Dagan and Sabjat Tanuchad, in the Hauza, Bagari and Mahbes sectors, respectively. The SADR called on the African Commission on Human and Peoples' Rights to end Morocco's military presence in Western Sahara.
23 November: The SPLA claimed through its official news agency to have carried out new attacks against the Moroccan occupation forces positioned in the regions of Tajalit At-talah and Guerat Uld Blal, in the sectors of Um Dreiga and Mahbes, respectively.
24 November: The SPLA claimed through its official news agency to have carried out new attacks against the positions and entrenchments of the Moroccan forces at various points of the Moroccan wall, in the Fadrat Al-maras region in the Hauza sector.
25 November: The SPLA claimed through its official news agency to have carried out new attacks against the positions and entrenchments of the Moroccan forces at various points of the Moroccan wall, in Sabjat Tanuchad and Guerat Uld Blal regions in Mahbes sector.
1 December: The SPLA claimed through its official news agency to have carried out new attacks against positions of the Moroccan forces along the Moroccan wall, in the region of Tajalit At-Talah in Um Dreiga sector, Udey Adamrán in Mahbes and the command of the 43rd Regiment located in the Amitir Lemkhinza region, in Mahbes.
2 December: The SPLA claimed through its official news agency to have carried out attacks on Moroccan forces entrenched in the Laagad and Guerat ULD Blal areas, both in the Mahbes sector.
3 December: The SPLA claimed through its official news agency to have launched bombardments at Moroccan positions, in the regions of Um Dagan and Fadrat Almars, in the Bagari and Hauza sectors, respectively.
4 December: The SPLA claimed through its official news agency to have launched bombardments at Moroccan positions, in the regions of Agrarat al-Atása and the Udey Damrán, Mahbes sector, as well as the regions of Tajalat Talh and Steilat Uld Bugrein in the Um Dreiga and Auserd sectors, respectively.
5 December: The SPLA claimed through its official news agency to have carried out new attacks against the Moroccan forces in the sectors of Hauza, Umdrega, Awsard and Mahbes.
6 December: The Spanish Minister of Foreign Affairs, José Manuel Albares, reaffirmed his country's commitment to the relaunch of the dialogue to resolve the conflict in Western Sahara.
7 December: Brahim Ghali, affirmed in a letter he addressed to the UN Secretary General, António Guterres, that "[the Polisario] will not engage in any peace process while the Moroccan state continues imposing its reign on the Saharawi civilians in the occupied territories of Western Sahara."
8 December: The SPLA claimed through its official news agency to have launched new attacks against various targets of the Moroccan forces at different points of their positions throughout from the Moroccan Wall.
9 December: Brahim Ghali, affirmed to the Polisario's official news agency that "the Polisario will not adhere to any peace process at a time when Morocco imposes its regime on the occupied Sahrawi territories".
10 December: The SPLA claimed through its official news agency to have carried out attacks on FAR base 14 and destroyed its radar in the regions of Guerat ULD Blal, Udey Damrán and Udey Emarkba, the Mahbes sector, and reached the area of Fadrat Aaach in the Hauza sector.
11 December: The SPLA claimed through its official news agency to have carried out new attacks against positions of the Moroccan forces in Galb Nass and Aadeim Umajlud in the Hauza and Auserd sectors, respectively and bombarded the northern area of Dirit located in the Hauza sector.
12 December: The SPLA claimed through its official news agency to have launched bombardments at the regions of Galb Nass and Aadeim Umajlud in the Hauza and Auserd sectors. According to the Polisario's official news agency, Brahim Ghali, said during a speech in the Dakhla refugee camp in Tindouf, Algeria that "the Moroccan occupier is the origin of the conflict in El Guerguerat given the assaults he committed against the Sahrawi people."
13 December: The SPLA claimed through its official news agency to have bombed the regions of Laagad, Grarat Alfarsik and Asteilat ULD Bugrein in the Mahbes and Auserd sectors, respectively.
14 December: The SPLA claimed through its official news agency to have launched concentrated bombardments against Moroccan positions in the regions of Rus Bin Zakka, Dirit, Al-Aidiyat and Rus Bin Amera, in the sectors of Hauza, Guelta and Farsía, respectively.
15 December: The SPLA claimed through its official news agency to have launched concentrated bombardments against the positions and entrenchments of the Moroccan forces in the regions of Gararat Al-Firsik and Rus Asabti, in the Mahbes sector.
16 December: The SPLA claimed through its official news agency to have carried out new attacks against positions of the Moroccan forces along the Moroccan wall, in the regions of Udeyat Achadida, Taraganit, Lagteitira, Lagseibi Lamlas and Asteilat Uld Bugrein in the Farsía, Hauza and Auserd sectors.
17 December: The SPLA claimed through its official news agency to have carried out new attacks against positions of the Moroccan forces along the Moroccan wall, in the regions of Udey Damrán and Udey Amarkba in the Mahbes sector.
18 December: The SPLA claimed through its official news agency to have carried out new attacks against positions of the Moroccan forces in the Agseiby Najla, Rass Lagseibi, Fadrat Almars and Alatása in the Hauza and Mahbes sectors, respectively.
19 December: The SPLA claimed through its official news agency to have carried out intensive attacks targeting Moroccan soldiers in the regions of Targanat, Russ Arbeib, Al ga'aa, Lagteitira, Aadeim Um Ajlud, Aadeim Um Ajlud, Sabjat Tanuchad and allegedly bombed the headquarters of the Royal Moroccan Army's 43rd regiment in the Ameitir Lamjeinza, in the Hauza, Auserd and Mahbes sectors.
20 December: The SPLA claimed through its official news agency to have carried out new attacks against positions of the Moroccan forces in the regions of Hafrat Achiaf, Galb An-nas and Gararat Al-Firsik in the sectors of Bagari, Auserd and Mahbes, respectively.
21 December: The SPLA claimed through its official news agency to have concentrated their attacks against Moroccan forces in Fadrat Labeir, Fadrat Al-Ich, Taraganit, Galb An-nas, Asteilat Uld Bugrein, Udei Adamran and Udei Um Rakba regions in the sectors of Farsía, Hauza, Auserd and Mahbes.
22 December: The SPLA claimed through its official news agency to have attacked several positions of the Moroccan forces along the Moroccan wall in Laagad, Sabjat Tanuchad and Um Dagan regions, in the Mahbes and Bagari sectors, respectively.
23 December: The SPLA claimed through its official news agency to have bombed Moroccan positions in the Fadrat Abruk region, Hauza sector
24 December: The SPLA claimed through its official news agency to have attacked several positions of the Moroccan forces along the Moroccan wall, in Tuayil area in the Umdreiga sector.
25 December: The SPLA claimed through its official news agency to have carried out new attacks against the entrenchments of the Moroccan forces in the area of Fadrat Alaaach, in the Hauza sector, and Russ Sabti in the Mahbes sector.
26 December: The SPLA claimed through its official news agency to have attacked several positions of the Moroccan forces along the Moroccan wall, in the Russ Sabti and Udey Amarkba areas, both in the Mahbes sector.
27 December: The SPLA claimed through its official news agency to have intensified their attacks on the entrenchments of the Moroccan forces in the two regions of Astila Ould Boukrine and Kelb Ennes in the Ausard sector, and in Akouira Ould Ablal in the Mahbes sector.
28 December: The SPLA claimed through its official news agency to have attacked several positions of the Moroccan forces along the Moroccan wall, in Edeim Umm Jlud region, Auserd sector in addition to Rus Sabbti and Cheidmia, in the Mahbes sector.
29 December: The SPLA claimed through its official news agency to have attacked several positions of the Moroccan forces, in the Rus Udei Adamran regions, in Mahbes, and the Adeim Um Ajlud region, in Auserd.
30 December: The SPLA claimed through its official news agency to have concentrated their attacks against the Moroccan forces in the regions of Fadrat Lagrab, Rus Fadrat Lagrab, Rus Fadrat Dirit, Rus Arbeiyab Al-Geya, Rus Lagteitra and Fadrat Taraganit, in the Hauza sector. The commander of the SPLA, Mohamed Luali Akeik, stated that "[the SPLA] will continue its mission of fighting until achieving independence and establishing total sovereignty over Western Sahara."
31 December: The SPLA claimed through its official news agency to have carried out attacks on the areas of Lagseiby Lamlas, Lagseiby Kassar and the area of Lamkeitab, both in the Hauza sector and the Sabjat Tanuchad area in the Mahbes sector.

2022 

1 January: The SPLA claimed through its official news agency to have bombarded the 43rd regiment of the Moroccan Army in the Amitir Lemkhinza region, and carried out attacks on the Laâked area in the Mahbes sector.
2 January: The SPLA claimed through its official news agency to have carried out new attacks in Ahreichat Dirit and Udey Damran regions in the Hauza and Mahbes sectors, respectively.
3 January: The SPLA claimed through its official news agency to have carried out new attacks against the Moroccan forces in Oudi Edamrane area in the Mahbas sector.
4 January: The SPLA claimed through its official news agency to have launched new attacks against the entrenchments of the Moroccan forces in the Laagad region, Mahbes sector.
5 January: The SPLA claimed through its official news agency to have concentrated their bombardments against Moroccan forces positioned in the Rus Bin Amera region, in the Farsia region, as well as the regions of Laagad, Udei Adamran, Gararat Al-Firsik and Sabjat Tanuchad, in the Mahbes sector. The SPLA also reportedly carried outbombardments against the 65th regiment's command post in the Laagad region.
6 January: The SPLA claimed through its official news agency to have concentrated their bombardments on the regions of Bin Zakka, Rus Lagseibiyin and Fadrat Al-Ich in the Hauza sector.
7 January: The SPLA claimed through its official news agency to have bombed the areas of Udey Damrán, Sabjat Tanuchad, Russ Sabti, Grarat Afarsik and Guerat ULD Blal in the Mahbes sector.
8 January: The SPLA claimed through its official news agency to have bombed the region of Sabjat Tanuchad, in the Mahbes sector.
9 January: The SPLA claimed through its official news agency to have bombed the regions of Grarat Alfarsik and Galb Nass in the Mahbes and Auserd sectors, respectively.
10 January: The SPLA claimed through its official news agency to have bombed the regions of Fadrat Lagrab, Fadrat Al-Ich and Rus Asabti, in the sectors of Hauza and Mahbes, respectively. The representative of the Polisario Front to the United Nations, Sidi Mohamed Omar, affirmed that "the Saharawi side is willing to cooperate with the efforts of the United Nations and the African Union to achieve a peaceful and lasting solution to the conflict".
11 January: The SPLA claimed through its official news agency to have concentrated their bombardments against Moroccan forces in the regions of Jangat Huría, Rus Udei As-sfaa and Gararat Lahdid, in the Smara and Farsía sectors, respectively.
12 January: The SPLA, claimed through its official news agency that their units carried out concentrated attacks against the entrenchments of the Moroccan forces in the Fadrat Al-Mars region, in the Hauza and the regions of Um Lagsa and Acheidmiya, in the Mahbes sector. The latter region had several vehicles and military equipment destroyed in the attacked base, including a Katyusha rocket launcher.
13 January: The SPLA claimed through its official news agency to have bombed the regions of Rus Faraa Udei As-sfaa, Fadrat Al-Ich, Guerat Uld Blal and Sabjat Tanuchad in the regions of Hauza and Mahbes. The United Nations Personal Envoy for Western Sahara, Staffan de Mistura visited Rabat to meet Nasser Bourita, the Moroccan Minister of Foreign Affairs and Omar Hilale, Morocco's Permanent Ambassador to the United Nations, as part of the UN efforts to promote negotiations between the parties in conflict and a solution to the dispute. Morocco reiterated its position that Morocco has full sovereignty over Western Sahara.
14 January: The SPLA, claimed through its official news agency to launched bombardments at the Moroccan army's 43rd battalion command headquarters in the Umeitir Lamjeinza area, and at Moroccan positions stationed in the areas of Agrarat Al-Farsik and Russ Sabti, both in the Mahbes sector.
15 January: The UN Personal Envoy for Western Sahara, Staffan de Mistura visited Algers and the Saharawi refugee camps in Tindouf, as part of the UN efforts to promote negotiations between the parties in conflict and a solution to the dispute. de Mistura met high-ranking officials of the Polisario Front, and the Secretary General of the Polisario Front, Brahim Ghali. Sidi Mohamed Omar, stated that "he does not expect much from de Mistura's visit, considering it a contact visit with the authorities of the parties in the conflict, (namely the SADR and Morocco), not in negotiation." Omar later stated that "[the Polisario front] no longer sees the self-determination referendum as a possible solution, but cling to their legitimate right to full independence for Western Sahara". During his visit to the Tindouf camps, de Mistura was photographed with a child soldier serving for the Polisario Front, this caused widespread controversy and indignation, the UN Press Secretary later denied that de Mistura noticing the child soldier. The SPLA claimed through its official news agency to have launched bombardments in the Umeitir Lamjeinza area, and at Moroccan positions stationed in the Agrarat Al-Farsik and Russ Sabti areas, both in the Mahbes sector.
16 January: De Mistura met with the head of the Political Organization of the Polisario Front, Khatri Addouh, in Dar Diafa, Shahid Al Hafed. The chief negotiator affirmed that UN should seek peaceful settlement based on failure of past approaches. Later, he was received by Brahim Ghali in his office at the Saharawi Presidency with the presence of the Polisario representative at the UN, Sidi Mohamed Omar. The President of the CONASADH, Abba El-Haissan, warned about UN Failure to protect international humanitarian and human rights laws in Western Sahara. The SPLA said that it had launched new attacks on military targets in the Mahbes sector. The Chief of Staff of the Saharawi Army, Mohamed Luali Akeik, said that the conflict continues despite the fact that Morocco denied it.
17 January: De Mistura concluded his peacekeeping visit, heading to Nouakchott on his third stop, as part of his first tour to the region. The SPLA claimed through its official news agency to have attacked the positions of the Moroccan forces in the Gararat Achadida and Gararat Lahdid regions, in the Farsía sector.
18 January: The SPLA claimed through its official news agency to have carried out bombardments on the Fadrat Al-Ich and Adeim Um Ajlud regions, in the Hauza and Auserd sectors, respectively.
19 January: The SPLA claimed through its official news agency to have launched bombardments against the positions of the Moroccan forces in the Gararat Al-Firsik and Udei Adamran regions, in the Mahbes sector.
20 January: The SPLA claimed through its official news agency to have launched concentrated attacks against the positions of the Moroccan forces along the Moroccan Wall, in the Galb An-nas and Ahreichat Dirit regions, in the Auserd and Hauza sectors, respectively.
21 January: The SPLA claimed through its official news agency to have launched bombardments in the areas of Laagad, Guerat ULD Blal and Fadrat Lagráb in the Mahbes and Hauza sectors, respectively.
22 January: The SPLA claimed through its official news agency to have launched bombardments on the Russ Sabti and Agrarat Al-Farsik areas and on Moroccan troops stationed in the Udey Damran area, both in the Mahbes sector.
23 January: The SPLA claimed through its official news agency to have launched bombings on Fadrat Lagraab, Galb Nass and Agrarat Al-Farsik regions in the Hauza, Auserd and Mahbes sectors, respectively.
24 January: The SPLA claimed through its official news agency to have made attacks on Laagad, Tanuchad and Agrarat Al-Farsik in the Mahbes sector.
25 January: The SPLA claimed through its official news agency to have attacked the Moroccan positions at various points of the Moroccan Wall, in the Guerat ULD Blal region in Mahbes sector.
26 January: The SPLA claimed through its official news agency to have launched shelling against Moroccan forces in the Sabjat Tanuchad and Um Dagan regions, in the Mahbes and Bagari sectors, respectively.
27 January: The SPLA claimed through its official news agency to have bombarded Moroccan positions in the Sabjat Tanuchad and Gararat Al-Firsik regions, in the Mahbes sector. In his speech, Brahim Ghali blamed "the Moroccan State for the serious events that threaten peace and security in the region".
28 January: The SPLA claimed through its official news agency to have launched bombardments in the Fadrat Laach and Russ Dirit areas, both in the Hauza sector.
29 January: The SPLA claimed through its official news agency to have launched bombardments in the Farsía sector, and the Galb Nass and Fadrat Tamát regions in the Auserd and Hauza sectors, respectively.
30 January: The SPLA claimed through its official news agency to have launched bombardments in the areas of Sabjat Tanuchad and Udey Damrán, both in the Mahbes sector.
31 January: The SPLA claimed through its official news agency to have attacked the positions of Moroccan forces in the regions of Laagad, Steilat Uld Bugerin and Um Dagan, in the sectors of Mahbes, Auserd and Bagari, respectively.
1 February: The SPLA claimed through its official news agency to have launched bombings at the command post of the Moroccan army's 65th regiment in Laagad, as well as several targets in the Aagad Arkan region, in Mahbes.
2 February: The SPLA claimed through its official news agency to have concentrated their attacks against the Moroccan forces positioned in the Agsibi An-Najla, Agseibi Amchagab and Lagseibi Lamlas, in the Hauza sector and the Sabjat Tanuchad, Udei Adamran and Laaran regions, in Mahbes.
3 February: The SPLA claimed through its official news agency to have launched bombings against the Moroccan forces positioned in the Fadrat Al-Ich and Fadrat Lagrab regions.
4 February: The SPLA claimed through its official news agency to have launched bombing attacks on Moroccan positions in the Russ Arbeib, Russ Lagteitira and Russ Turkanat regions in the Hauza sector.
5 February: The SPLA claimed through its official news agency to have launched bombardments on Moroccan positions in the regions of Sabjat Tanuchad and Laagad in the Mahbes sector, and Russ Arbeib, Russ Lagteitira and Russ Turkanat in the Hauza sector.
6 February: During the 35th Summit of African Union Heads of State and Government held in Addis Ababa, Brahim Ghali informed African leaders of "the dangerous developments recorded in Western Sahara after the end of ceasefire", He compares "the practices pursued by Morocco [against Sahrawi people] to those practiced by the Israeli occupation against the Palestinian people". The SPLA claimed through its official news agency to have carried out new attacks against positions of the Moroccan forces in the regions of Chadimiya and Rous Es-sebti in the Mahbas sector, as well as in the region of Laksibi Lamlas in the Hawza sector.
7 February: The SPLA claimed through its official news agency to have targeted the entrenchments of Moroccan soldiers in several regions of the Hawza sector, including the regions of Rous Benzekka, Lemkiteb and Rous Terkanet.
8 February: The SPLA claimed through its official news agency to have launched heavy bombardments against various positions along the Moroccan Wall, in the Gararat Achadida and Gararat Lahdid regions in the Farsía sector, and the Gararat Al-Firsik, Udei Adamran, Laagad and Udei Um Rakba regions in the Mahbes sector.
9 February: The SADR Ministry of Defense issued a war report summarising the combat operations that have been carried out by the SPLA in the first week of February, including a list of a total 12 Moroccan human losses. The SPLA claimed through its official news agency to have launched concentrated bombardments in the Lagseibi Lamlas region, in Hauza, as well as in the Um Lagta and Sabjat Tanucahd regions, in Mahbes.
10 February: The SPLA claimed through its official news agency to have concentrated their attacks against the entrenchments of Moroccan forces in the Gararat Al-Firsik, Um Dagan, Rus Taraganit and Fadrat Labeir regions in the Mahbes, Bagari, Hauza and Farsia sectors, respectively.
11 February: A senior military official in the Sixth Military Region of the SPLA told the Polisario Front's official news agency that there were 8 Moroccan losses in early February 2022 near Mahbes. Morocco allegedly stated that the cause of these deaths was due to COVID-19 or other causes. The SPLA claimed through its official news agency to have launched bombing attacks on Moroccan positions in the Agseiby Najla and Agseibi Amchagab regions in the Hauza sector.
12 February: The SPLA claimed through its official news agency to have launched bombardments in the regions of Udey Adamrán and Agrarat Al-Farsik in the Mahbes sector, and the Tandkama Al-Bayda area, Um Dreiga sector.
13 February: The SPLA claimed through its official news agency to have launched bombardments in Laagad, Sabjat Tanuchad and Lamkeitab regions in the Mahbes and Hauza sectors, respectively.
14 February: The SPLA claimed through its official news agency to have attacked the regions of Galb An-nas, Tandakma Al-Beida and Guerat Uld Blal in the Auserd, Um Dreiga and Mahbes sectors, respectively.
15 February: The SPLA claimed through its official news agency to have launched several attacks against the Moroccan forces in the Udei Adamran, Fadrat Tamat and Sahab Achadida in the Mahbes, Hauza and Farsía sectors, respectively.
18 February: The SPLA claimed through its official news agency to have launched bombing attacks on Moroccan positions in the Um Dagan area in the Bagari sector.
19 February: The SPLA claimed through its official news agency to have launched bombardments on Moroccan positions in the regions of Al-Aría, Lairán, Aagad Argán, Guerat ULD Blal and the 65th regiment's command headquarters of the Moroccan army in Laaked, Mahbes sector, as well as the Russ Lagteitira and Um Dagan regions in the Hauza and Bagari sectors, respectively.
20 February: The SPLA claimed through its official news agency to have launched bombing attacks on Moroccan positions in the Sabjat Tanuchad, Lagseibi Lamlas and Legseibi Al-Kasir and Aadeim Um Ajlud, in the Mahbes, Hauza and Auserd sectors, respectively.
21 February: The SPLA claimed through its official news agency to have launched bombing attacks on Moroccan positions in the Russ Targánat region in the Hauza sector.
22 February: SPLA launched new attacks in the Mahbes sector, against the entrenchments of the Moroccan forces in the regions of Gararat Al-Firsik and Udei Um Rakba.
23 February: SPLA launched heavy shelling against the entrenchments of the Moroccan forces in Rus Asabti region, in the Mahbes sector and in the Amagli Adachra and Amagli Labgar regions, in the Amgala sector.
24 February: SPLA attacked Moroccan forces positioned in the Tandakma Al-Beida and Um Dagan regions, in the Bagari sector and in the Azamul Um Jamla region, in Um Dreiga. In addition, SPLA attacked Moroccan forces entrenched in the Gararat Al-Atasa region, as well as the 43rd regiment's command base in the Ameitir Lamjeinza region, in the Mahbes sector.
25 February: SPLA bombarded Moroccan positions in the areas of Laagad, Guerta Uld Blal, Sabjat Tanuchad and Russ Udey Damràn, in the Mahbes sector, as well as the Tandagma Albeida region, in the Bagari sector.
26 February: SPLA launched bombing attacks on Moroccan positions in the Grarat Alfarsik and Udey Emarkba areas, in the Mahbes sector.
27 February: SPLA bombarded Moroccan positions in the Rus Acheidmiya and Udey Damràn areas, in the Mahbes sector.
28 February: SPLA attacked Moroccan positions in the Guerat Uld Blal and Sabjat Tanuchad regions, in the Mahbes sector, and in the Adeim Um Ajlud region, in Auserd sector.
1 March: SPLA attacked Moroccan forces in the Udei Um Rkba and Gararat Al-Firsik regions, in the Mahbes sector.
2 March: SPLA bombarded Moroccan positions in the Gasbat Achuhada and Gararat Al-Arabi regions, in the Atweizegui sector and the Amheibas At-tarab, Aagad Aragan and Laaran, in the Mahbes sector.
3 March: SPLA bombarded Moroccan positions in the Gararat Al-Firsik region, in the Mahbes sector.
4 March: SPLA bombarded the 43rd regiment's command base of the Moroccan army in the Ameitir Lamjeinza region, in the Mahbes sector, and neutralized a Moroccan BM-21 Grad artillery battery.
5 March: SPLA attacked Moroccan forces in the areas of Guerat Uld Blal and Sabjat Tanuchad, in the Mahbes sector.
6 March: SPLA launched bombardments on Moroccan positions located in the Guerat Uld Blal, Sabjat Tanuchad, Grarat Alfarsik, Amheibas Tedrib, Aagad Argàn, Laaràn, Agseibat Shuhadà and Grarat Alaarbi in the Mahbes and Tuizgui sectors, respectively.
7 March: SPLA launched bombardments on Moroccan positions located in the Grarat Chdeida, Russ Sueihat and Taraf Ahmeida areas, in the Farsía sector and in the Fadrat Laach area in the Hauza sector, as well as in Um Lagta and Laagad, in the Mahbes sector.
8 March: SPLA bombarded the entrenchments of the Moroccan forces in the Guerat Uld Blal, Laagad, Sabjat Tanuchad, Gararat Al-Firsik and Um Lagti regions in the Mahbes sector.
9 March: SPLA carried out new attacks against the Moroccan forces positioned in the Laagad region, in the Mahbes sector.
11 March: SPLA launched bombardments on Moroccan positions located in the Grarat Alfarsik and Udey Damràn regions, in the Mahbes sector.
12 March: SPLA launched bombardments on Moroccan positions located in the Russ Cheidmiya and Udey Amarkba areas, in the Mahbes sector.
13 March: SPLA launched bombardments on Moroccan positions located in the Grarat Chdeida and Alfieín regions, in the Farsìa sector.
14 March: SPLA bombarded Moroccan positions in the Gararat Achadida, Gararat Lahdid and Al-Faiyin regions, in the Farsía sector, as well as in the Tanuchad region, in the Mahbes sector.
15 March: SPLA attacked Moroccan forces in the Guerat Uld Blal region, in the Mahbes sector.
16 March: SPLA attacked Moroccan forces positioned in the Garart Achadida, Ajbeilat Aljadar and Gararat Al-Firsik regions in the Farsía, Guelta and Mahbes sectors, respectively.
17 March: SPLA launched bombardments on Moroccan forces located in the Rus Asabti and Udei Adamrán regions, in the Mahbes sector.
19 March: SPLA launched new attacks in the Grarat Chdeid, Jbeilat Aljadar and Grarat Al-Farsik areas in the Farsía, Guelta and Mahbes sectors.
19 March: SPLA bombarded Moroccan positions in the Laagad area in the Mahbes sector.
20 March: SPLA launched bombardments on Moroccan positions located in the Guerat Uld Blal area in the Mahbes sector.
21 March: SPLA launched bombardments on Moroccan positions located in the Ajbeilat Aljadar area in the Guelta sector.
22 March: SPLA bombarded Moroccan positions in the Acheidmiya, Rus Asabti and Udei Adamran regions, in the Mahbes sector.
23 March: SPLA launched bombing attacks on Moroccan positions in the Rus Ajbeilat Lajdar, Laagad, Guerat Uld Blal and Sabjat Tanuchad regions, in the Mahbes and Guelta sectors, respectively.
24 March: SPLA attacked Moroccan positions in the Udei Um Rakba region, in the Mahbes sector.
25 March: SPLA bombarded Moroccan positions in the Laagad and Guerat Uld Blal, in the Mahbes sector.
26 March: SPLA attacked Moroccan positions in the Grarat Alfarsik, Udey Damrà and Russ sabti regions, in the Mahbes sector and in the Amagli Dachra and Amigli Alhàra regions, in the Guelta sector.
27 March: SPLA launched bombardments on Moroccan forces located in the Um lagta, Russ Cheidmiya, Grarata Chdeida, Grarat Lahdid and Ajbeilat Albid regions in the Mahbes, Farsía and Guelta sectors, respectively.
28 March: SPLA launched bombardments against Moroccan positions located in the Guerat Uld Blal region, Laagad, and Gaarat Al-Firsik, in the Mahbes sector, as well as in the regions of Taref Hamida, Rus Asweihat and Gararat Achadida, in the Farsia sector.
2 April: SPLA launched bombardments against Moroccan positions in the Laagaad and Grarat Alfarsik areas, both in the Mahbes sector.
3 April: SPLA launched bombardments against Moroccan positions in the Udey Damràn area in the Mahbes sector.
4 April: SPLA launched launched bombardments on Moroccan forces in the Kaydiat area, Um Dreiga sector.
6 April: SPLA launched bombardments against Moroccan positions in the Gararat Lahdid and Gararat Achadida regions, in Farsia sector.
7 April: SPLA attacked Moroccan forces positioned in The Rus Asabti and Guerat Uld Blal regions in the Mahbes sector, as well as the special intervention group's general headquarters of the 47th Battalion, in the Um Dagan region, Um Dagan sector.
8 April: SPLA launched bombardments against Moroccan forces in the areas of Udey Damràn and Laagad, both in the Mahbes sector.
10 April: Moroccan forces reportedly killed three Algerian citizens in an airstrike on a truck convoy close to Ain Ben Tili, Mauritania.
11 April: SPLA attacked Moroccan forces positioned in the regions of Ajbeilat Albid, Lemsamir, Gararat Al-Arabi, Gasbat Achuhada and Rus Asabti, in the sectors of Guelta, Atweizegui and Mahbes, respectively.
12 April: SPLA launched bombardments against Moroccan positions in the regions of Fadrat Al-Mars, north of Galb Dirit, Al-Ariya and Amheibas At-tadrib, in the Hauza and Mahbes sectors, respectively.
13 April: SPLA launched bombardments against Moroccan positions in the Gararat Al-Firsik and Udei Adamran regions, in the Mahbes sector.

Non-military actions taken by Morocco and the SADR 
On 13 November 2020, both Morocco and the SADR introduced mass mobilisation. The SADR evacuated civilians from the Guerguerat area and introduced a curfew in the territories under its control.

Reactions

Official statements 

 : On 13 November, the Authenticity and Modernity Party, the Party of Progress and Socialism, the Popular Movement Party, and the Independence Party voiced their support for the Moroccan military intervention. The next day, the House of Representatives of Morocco issued a statement, stressing that the military intervention was legitimate. On 16 November, King Mohammed VI stated that Morocco would take necessary measures to "keep order and protect safety and fluidity of passenger and commercial traffic in the border area between Morocco and Mauritania", adding that the UN had failed in its "laudable attempts to end the unacceptable acts of the Polisario". Prime Minister Saadeddine Othmani said the operation led by the Moroccan forces was a "strategic change" to open the route in the Mauritania border.
 : On 16 November, SADR's minister of foreign affairs Mohamed Salem Ould Salek stated that the end of the war was now linked to the "end of the illegal occupation of parts of the territory of the Sahrawi Republic", and that the war had started as a "consequence of Morocco's aggression and action in Guerguerat".

Domestic 
On 13 November, Sahrawi sources stated that there were mass protests in Laayoune, the unofficial capital of Western Sahara, which is de facto administered by Morocco, against the clashes. The Moroccan media denied these claims, stating that the city's population was in support of the Moroccan forces, citing Laayoune's mayor. Despite that, the NGO media outlet Équipe Media reported that the Moroccan government was exercising a strong police force, and had arrested several activists. The next day, the same source stated that the Moroccan security forces had arrested several demonstrators in Smara.

On 14 November, some Sahrawi tribal leaders issued a joint statement in support of the Moroccan intervention to restore free movement in Guerguerat. More than fifty riders from the Moroccan Bikers Club and the Royal Petanque Club organized a trip from Casablanca to the Guerguerat border crossing starting on 27 December and ending on 3 January 2021, in a way to express their support for the Moroccan army's move to secure the crossing.

Sahrawi self-determination activist Sultana Khaya described Moroccan control of the Western Sahara as an occupation and called for the United States to intensify diplomatic pressure on Morocco in favor of self-determination. She has been under de facto house arrest since November 2020 and subject to repeated home raids and sexual assault by Moroccan security forces, as reported by a number of international human rights organizations.

International

Supranational and regional organisations 
The Secretary-General of the United Nations, António Guterres, and the chairperson of the African Union Commission, Moussa Faki, expressed their grave concern over the conflict, with Faki stating "[The] Saharan issue has gone on for a long time and it has become urgent to solve it as a case of decolonization in the first place and to support the UN efforts in this regard." The High Representative of the Union for Foreign Affairs and Security Policy, Josep Borrell, stated that the EU was supporting the efforts of the United Nations to find a peaceful settlement for the conflict, per the Security Council resolutions, and stressing the insurance of freedom of movement in Guerguerat. The secretary-general of the Organisation of Islamic Cooperation, Yousef Al-Othaimeen, and the secretary-general of the Gulf Cooperation Council, Nayef bin Falah Al-Hajraf, stated that they support Morocco's efforts to what they called "securing freedom of civil and commercial movement." On 20 November, the Chairperson of the African Union and President of the Republic of South Africa, Cyril Ramaphosa, wrote a letter to the United Nations Security Council that called for "all the parties to uphold the Settlement Plan, which provides for 'a cease-fire' and the holding of a referendum for the people of Western Sahara to exercise their right to self-determination." The Unrepresented Nations and Peoples Organization released a statement voicing its support for Western Sahara and condemned Morocco's "unlawful assertion" of sovereignty over Western Sahara.

Foreign governments 

Azerbaijan, Bahrain, the Central African Republic, Comoros, the Democratic Republic of the Congo, Chad, Djibouti, Equatorial Guinea, Gabon, the Gambia, Haiti, Jordan, Kuwait, Liberia, Oman, Qatar, São Tomé and Príncipe, Saudi Arabia, Senegal, Sierra Leone, Turkey, Yemen (Hadi government), and the United Arab Emirates voiced their support for Morocco, while Guyana withdrew its recognition of the SADR.

The Foreign Ministry of the State of Palestine said it "does not interfere in the internal affairs of the brotherly Arab countries". Egypt, Mauritania, Russia, and Spain have all urged both parties to respect the ceasefire.

South Africa, Algeria and several other states backed the Polisario Front, accused Morocco of violating the ceasefire and urged the UN to appoint a new Western Sahara envoy to restart talks. Algeria also sent 60 tons of food and medical aid to the refugees in Western Sahara. On the other hand, Spain's second deputy prime minister Pablo Iglesias Turrión, Cuba, and Venezuela have stated that they supported the right to self-determination of the Sahrawis.

Minorities abroad 
On 15 November, a group of Sahrawis staged a rally in front of the Moroccan consulate in Valencia, Spain. The protestors dismantled the flag of Morocco from the consulate, raising the SADR's flag over the building. Spain and Morocco condemned the incident.

Analysis 
According to International Crisis Group's Portuguese analytic Riccardo Fabiani, the conflict could be a "potential breaking point that could have major repercussions", adding that the United Nations had been quite negligent towards this issue.

References

Conflicts in 2020
Conflicts in 2021
Conflicts in 2022
Conflicts in 2023
History of Western Sahara
November 2020 events in Africa
Wars involving Morocco
2020s conflicts
2020 in Morocco
2021 in Morocco
2022 in Morocco
2023 in Morocco
2020 in Western Sahara
2021 in Western Sahara
2022 in Western Sahara
2023 in Western Sahara
2020 in international relations
2021 in international relations
2022 in international relations
2023 in international relations